Elections were held in Leeds and Grenville United Counties, Ontario on October 25, 2010 in conjunction with municipal elections across the province.

Leeds and Grenville United Counties Council

Athens

Augusta

Edwardsburgh/Cardinal

Elizabethtown-Kitley

Front of Yonge

Leeds and the Thousand Islands

Merrickville-Wolford

North Grenville

Rideau Lakes

Westport

2010 Ontario municipal elections
Leeds and Grenville United Counties